Brett Charles Rogers (born February 17, 1981) is an American former mixed martial artist who most recently competed in the Heavyweight division. A professional competitor since 2005, Rogers has fought in EliteXC, Strikeforce, and Bellator.

Background
Rogers was born in Chicago, Illinois and grew up in the south and west sides of the city, also living in the Cabrini Green housing project, a notoriously dangerous and gang-infested neighborhood. Rogers also grew up in this area during the crack cocaine epidemic, which made the neighborhood especially dangerous. He would often come to the aid of one of his younger brothers during street fights and, because of his imposing size, Rogers was often recruited to be in gangs, but turned down the offers. When he was twelve years old, Rogers moved to Minnesota with his grandmother.

Rogers attended Harding High School in Saint Paul, Minnesota where he played football and basketball. Rogers then went on to attend a junior college and began practicing Tae Kwon Do during this time. Before becoming a professional fighter, he had a job changing tires in a garage.  Rogers had fifteen "Tough Man" bouts before going into professional mixed martial arts.

Rogers began his MMA training with Team Bison in Bloomington, MN, in the garage of head trainer Mike Reilly. Currently, Rogers trains with "Ambition MMA" in a state-of-the-art training facility formed by Reilly and his partners in 2008. Rogers continues to train on a daily basis with Reilly.

Rogers was charged in early 2011 with third degree assault on his wife  and was immediately released from his Strikeforce contract.

Mixed martial arts career

Elite XC
In the EliteXC: Primetime post-fight press conference, Rogers called out internet sensation Kimbo Slice, stating that Kimbo's match with James Thompson was "garbage" and that Rogers believed Kimbo tapped to a guillotine choke in the first round. Kimbo Slice then stood up, telling Rogers, "That sounds like a challenge, big dog." Rogers then barked back, "It is. In the cage."  EliteXC folded later that year, and a match between the two was never consummated.

Strikeforce
In February 2009, Rogers signed with Strikeforce.  On June 6, 2009, at Strikeforce: Lawler vs Shields, he defeated former UFC heavyweight champion Andrei Arlovski by TKO after 22 seconds of the opening round. This victory launched Rogers to the top of the list of heavyweights in Strikeforce and he agreed to fight MMA legend Fedor Emelianenko on CBS in Fedor vs Rogers on November 7. In the second round Fedor hit Rogers with a hard overhand right that dropped Rogers to the ground and John McCarthy quickly stopped the bout, breaking Brett's undefeated record with a KO loss.

Rogers was scheduled to face Alistair Overeem on May 15, 2010 at Strikeforce: Heavy Artillery.  After a great deal of discussions on whether or not the bout would be for Overeem's Strikeforce Heavyweight Championship, it was confirmed on March 29 that the title would indeed be on the line. On May 15, 2010, Rogers lost to Overeem via TKO (strikes) at 3:40 of round one, landing only one punch in the entire fight according to CompuStrike. Rogers picked up a win against Ruben Villareal by decision in the W-1 promotion.
Brett Rogers was defeated via a one arm triangle choke submission by Josh Barnett on June 18, 2011 at Strikeforce: Dallas as part of an eight-man heavyweight tournament.

Independent promotions
Rogers made his return to MMA at Titan Fighting Championships 20 against UFC veteran Eddie Sanchez.  He lost the fight via split decision.

Rogers was expected to fight Dave Keeley at M-1 Global - Korea on August 17, 2013. The fight didn't happen because the event was cancelled for unknown reasons.

Bellator Fighting Championships
On June 5, 2012 it was announced that Rogers had signed a deal with Bellator Fighting Championships. He made his debut on June 22, 2012 at Bellator 71 against Kevin Asplund and won the bout by TKO after Asplund's eye closed up between rounds, prompting the referee to stop the fight.

Rogers competed in the Bellator season seven heavyweight tournament and faced Alexander Volkov in the quarter finals at Bellator 75. Volkov dominated the fight by making the most of his reach advantage. Rogers lost via unanimous decision.
It was later revealed that Rogers had broken his arm during the fight, leading to his poor performance.

Rogers was scheduled to face Eric Prindle at Bellator 93 on March 21 but the fight was cancelled when Prindle pulled out.

Independent promotions
After leaving Bellator, Rogers next fought at FEFoMP: Mayor Cup 2013 against Evgeny Erokhin on October 5. He won the fight by split decision.

His next fight was at Super Fighting Enterprise where he faced Edson Ramos on November 30. He won by knockout to become the SFE Heavyweight Champion, the first championship of his career.

One month later, he fought at Inoki Bom-Ba-Ye 2013 where he faced Phil De Fries. He lost the fight by submission.

In his next bout, Rogers faced up-and-coming Russian prospect Konstantin Erokhin at Fight Nights - Battle of Moscow 15 on March 28, 2014. Rogers lost via unanimous decision.

Rogers' next appearance was at Inoki Genome Fight 1 on April 4, 2014, against Yusuke Kawaguchi. Rogers won the bout via knockout in just 28 seconds.

On May 17, 2014, Rogers faced Evgeny Erokhin in a rematch at FEFoMP- Mayor Cup 2014. Rogers was knocked out with a right hook to the chin in the later stages of round two.

The following July, Rogers faced Magomed Malikov at Fight Nights: Battle of Moscow 16. Rogers won via TKO when Malikov broke his leg while attempting a right low kick in the second round.

Rogers faced Denis Goltsov on September 19, 2014, at Tech-Krep FC: PRIME 3. He lost the fight via unanimous decision.

Rogers faced Aslambek Musaev on October 4, 2014, at ACB 10: Coliseum Time. He won via TKO in the first round.

Personal life 
In September 2011, Rogers pleaded guilty to domestic abuse for choking his wife and repeatedly punching her to unconsciousness in June 2011. Rogers’s children could not stop him and his oldest daughter told the police that Rogers would not only beat his wife, but also beat his children. Rogers received 60 days and nights in jail, three years' probation and a $500 fine.

Rogers was arrested for sexual misconduct after allegedly groping two men in Saint Paul, Minnesota according to criminal complaints obtained from Minnesota Second Judicial District Court.  On November 15, 2016 at the George Latimer Central Library, Rogers grabbed the crotch area of a library employee’s pants and penis while riding the elevator. The man reportedly slapped Rogers’s hand away and asked what he was doing. Rogers said nothing to the man and left the elevator as soon as the door opened.  In another incident on November 22, 2016, Rogers grabbed a man’s hand and pulled it toward his groin after asking the man if he wanted to go hang out or go to an apartment Rogers lived in.

On January 4, 2017, Rogers asked a man next to his urinal stall to go into another stall for a sex act to be performed on him from Rogers.  After the man declined, Rogers grabbed the man's buttocks as he was still using the urinal. The man made a quick exit and later called the police and had a written statement filed.

While at the Ramsey County Jail, a former cellmate also accused Rogers of sexual assault. Rogers allegedly groped his cellmate’s penis through the prison uniform pants twice while the cellmate slept. The cellmate did not call for the guards, because he feared Rogers would hurt him, describing Rogers as “the biggest and strongest dude in the jail”. Rogers told jail officers that he tapped the cellmate’s leg, but he did not fondle him. Rogers said that when he talks to people, he touches or taps them, referring to it as “a black thing.”

Championships and accomplishments
Super Fighting Enterprise
SFE Heavyweight Championship (1 Time, Current)
Other
Fought in the First Ever MMA Fight in Primetime on a Major American Television Network

Mixed martial arts record

|-
|Loss
|align=center|17–10 (1)
|Derrick Mehmen
|Decision (unanimous)
|Abu Dhabi Warriors 2
|
|align=center|3
|align=center|5:00
|Abu Dhabi, United Arab Emirates
|
|-
|Win
|align=center|17–9 (1)
|Aslambek Musaev
|TKO (punches)
|ACB 10: Coliseum Time
|
|align=center|1
|align=center|3:25
|Grozny, Russia
|
|-
|Loss
|align=center|16–9 (1)
|Denis Goltsov
|Decision (unanimous)
|Tech-Krep FC: PRIME 3
|
|align=center|3
|align=center|5:00
|Krasnodar, Russia
|
|-

|-
|Win
|align=center|16–8 (1)
|Magomed Malikov
|TKO (leg injury)
|Fight Nights: Battle of Moscow 16
|
|align=center| 2
|align=center| 1:42
|Moscow, Russia
|
|-

|-
|Loss
|align=center|15–8 (1)
|Evgeny Erokhin
|KO (punch)
|FEFoMP: Mayor Cup 2014
|
|align=center|2
|align=center|3:27
|Moscow, Russia
|
|-

|-
|Win
|align=center|15–7 (1)
|Yusuke Kawaguchi
|KO (punches)
|Inoki Genome Fight 1
|
|align=center|1
|align=center|0:28
|Tokyo, Japan
|
|-
|Loss
|align=center|14–7 (1)
|Konstantin Erokhin
|Decision (unanimous)
|Fight Nights: Battle of Moscow 15
|
|align=center|3
|align=center|5:00
|Moscow, Russia
|
|-
|Loss
|align=center|14–6 (1)
|Phil De Fries
|Submission (rear-naked choke)
|Inoki Bom-Ba-Ye 2013
|
|align=center|1
|align=center|3:45
|Tokyo, Japan
|
|-
|Win
|align=center|14–5 (1)
|Edson Ramos
|KO (punches)
|SFE II
|
|align=center|1
|align=center|0:20
|Quito, Ecuador
|Won SFE Heavyweight Championship.
|-
|Win
|align=center|13–5 (1)
|Evgeny Erokhin
|Decision (split)
|FEFoMP: Mayor cup 2013
|
|align=center|3
|align=center|5:00
|Yuzhno-Sakhalinsk, Russia
|
|-
|Loss
|align=center|12–5 (1)
|Alexander Volkov
|Decision (unanimous)
|Bellator 75
|
|align=center|3
|align=center|5:00
|Hammond, Indiana, United States
|Bellator Season Seven Heavyweight Tournament Quarterfinal.
|-
|Win
|align=center|12–4 (1)
|Kevin Asplund
|TKO (doctor stoppage)
|Bellator 71
|
|align=center|2
|align=center|5:00
|Chester, West Virginia, United States
| 
|-
|NC
|align=center|11–4 (1)
|Todd Allee
|NC (illegal blow to back of head)
|IFL 45: My Bloody Valentine
|
|align=center|1
|align=center|1:18
|Auburn Hills, Michigan, United States
| 
|-
|Loss
|align=center|11–4
|Eddie Sanchez
|Decision (split)
|Titan Fighting Championships 20
|
|align=center|3
|align=center|5:00
|Kansas City, Kansas, United States
| 
|-
|Loss
|align=center|11–3
|Josh Barnett
|Submission (arm-triangle choke)
|Strikeforce: Overeem vs. Werdum
|
|align=center|2
|align=center|1:17
|Dallas, Texas, United States
|
|-
|Win
|align=center|11–2
|Ruben Villareal
|Decision (unanimous)
|W-1 MMA 6: New Ground
|
|align=center|3
|align=center|5:00
|Halifax, Nova Scotia, Canada
| 
|-
|Loss
|align=center|10–2
|Alistair Overeem
|TKO (punches)
|Strikeforce: Heavy Artillery
|
|align=center|1
|align=center|3:40
|St. Louis, Missouri, United States
|
|-
|Loss
|align=center|10–1
|Fedor Emelianenko
|TKO (punches)
|Strikeforce: Fedor vs. Rogers
|
|align=center|2
|align=center|1:48
|Hoffman Estates, Illinois, United States
|
|-
|Win
|align=center|10–0
|Andrei Arlovski
|TKO (punches)
|Strikeforce: Lawler vs. Shields
|
|align=center|1
|align=center|0:22
|St. Louis, Missouri, United States
|
|-
|Win
|align=center|9–0
|Abongo Humphrey
|TKO (knees)
|Strikeforce: Shamrock vs. Diaz
|
|align=center|1
|align=center|1:38
|San Jose, California, United States
| 
|-
|Win
|align=center|8–0
|Jon Murphy
|KO (punch)
|EliteXC: Primetime
|
|align=center|1
|align=center|1:01
|Newark, New Jersey, United States
| 
|-
|Win
|align=center|7–0
|James Thompson
|KO (punches)
|EliteXC: Street Certified
|
|align=center|1
|align=center|2:24
|Sunrise, Florida, United States
| 
|-
|Win
|align=center|6–0
|Ralph Kelly
|TKO (submission to punches)
|EliteXC: Renegade
|
|align=center|1
|align=center|1:43
|Corpus Christi, Texas, United States
| 
|-
|Win
|align=center|5–0
|Josh Melichar
|KO (punches)
|EFX: Fury
|
|align=center|1
|align=center|0:12
|Minneapolis, Minnesota, United States
| 
|-
|Win
|align=center|4–0
|Mark Racine
|TKO (punches)
|EFX: Fury
|
|align=center|1
|align=center|2:35
|Minnesota, United States
| 
|-
|Win
|align=center|3–0
|Brian Heden
|KO (punches)
|EFX: Fury
|
|align=center|1
|align=center|1:20
|Minneapolis, Minnesota, United States
| 
|-
|Win
|align=center|2–0
|Chris Clark
|TKO (punches)
|EFX: Fury
|
|align=center|1
|align=center|0:37
|Minnesota, United States
| 
|-
|Win
|align=center|1–0
|Stan Strong
|KO (punches)
|UCS: Throwdown at the T-Bar
|
|align=center|1
|align=center|0:13
|Ellsworth, Minnesota, United States
|

See also
 List of Bellator MMA alumni

References

American male mixed martial artists
Mixed martial artists from Illinois
Heavyweight mixed martial artists
Mixed martial artists utilizing taekwondo
African-American mixed martial artists
Living people
1981 births
Sportspeople from Chicago
American male taekwondo practitioners
American people convicted of assault
21st-century African-American sportspeople
20th-century African-American people